Apaporis (also known as Apaporis, en busca del río, Apaporis: In Search of One River or simply In Search of One River) is a Colombian documentary film directed by Antonio Dorado. The movie was produced by Antonio Dorado, Juan Carlos Paredes and Omar Dorado. It opened theatrically in New York City on July 30, 2010 and opens in Los Angeles on August 6, 2010 at the 14th Annual DocuWeeks.

References

External links
  Official Website
 

2010 films
2010s English-language films
2010s Spanish-language films
Documentary films about water and the environment
2010 documentary films
Colombian documentary films
2010 multilingual films
Colombian multilingual films